Sheikh Helal Uddin Stadium (also known as Bagerhat Stadium) is a multi-purpose stadium in Bagerhat, Bangladesh.

See also
Stadiums in Bangladesh
List of cricket grounds in Bangladesh

References

Cricket grounds in Bangladesh
Football venues in Bangladesh